Curbans Solar Park is a 33 MW solar farm near Curbans, in France. It has 145,000 Yingli PV panels, and is located at an altitude of 1000 m.

See also 

Photovoltaic power stations
List of largest power stations in the world
List of photovoltaic power stations

References

External links 
 Photographs

Photovoltaic power stations in France